Vincent Breen may refer to:

 Vincent DePaul Breen (1936–2003), American Roman Catholic bishop
 Vincent I. Breen (1911–1986), American Roman Catholic priest